Modesty Blaise is an action-adventure/spy fiction novel by Peter O'Donnell first published in 1965, featuring the character Modesty Blaise, whom O'Donnell had created for a comic strip in 1963.

History
This was the first novel to feature the character of Modesty Blaise and her right-hand-man, Willie Garvin. The series of books (all written by O'Donnell) ran concurrently with the comic strip until 1996 (the comic strip ran until 2001).

Technically, this is a novelisation of a screenplay O'Donnell wrote based upon the character, although it predated the film release by a year. The filmed version of the screenplay bore little resemblance to O'Donnell's original (the author was often quoted as saying only a single, inconsequential, line of dialogue remained from his original script). Although the 1966 film version of Modesty Blaise was not a critical success, the book proved popular with fans of both the comic strip and readers of spy fiction (Blaise was promoted on the cover of the first American edition by Doubleday as the feminine answer to James Bond), and O'Donnell followed up with 10 more novels and two short story collections over the next 30 years.

Most of the books had their first United Kingdom editions published by Souvenir Press, with Pan Books publishing all but the final volume, Cobra Trap, in paperback. A variety of American publishers, meanwhile, took turns issuing the series.

The American first edition by Doubleday was featured prominently in the Quentin Tarantino film Pulp Fiction (the hit man played by John Travolta is twice shown reading the book). Reportedly the director used a mock-up of the book for filming, rather than an actual copy. Tarantino has stated his interest in directing a Modesty Blaise film on several occasions, but to date the closest he's gotten was lending his name to a 2003 made-for-video production, Quentin Tarantino Presents: My Name Is Modesty.

In the mid-1990s, DC Comics published a one-shot Modesty Blaise graphic novel based upon the novel.

Plot summary
Willie Garvin has lost the will to live. He had worked for Modesty Blaise for six years in The Network, Modesty's criminal organisation, and rose to the position of her right-hand man and became her very best friend. Willie was on top of the world.

But then Modesty disbanded The Network and retired, and Willie didn't know what to do with himself. He got involved as a mercenary in a South American revolution, but his heart wasn't in it. He was captured and is now sitting in a primitive prison, waiting listlessly to be executed.

Fortunately, Sir Gerald Tarrant, head of a British secret service organisation, knows about Willie's situation, and he needs the services of Modesty and Willie for a very special mission. Sir Gerald visits Modesty and lays his cards on the table. Modesty is very grateful and agrees to help Sir Gerald as soon as she has rescued Willie.

This is the start of the adventure. Sir Gerald's job turns out to be a perilous intervention against the criminal mastermind Gabriel, who intends to steal a huge consignment of diamonds. The action starts in the south of France, where Willie causes Paco (who is on Gabriel's payroll) to lose his head (literally). Then it's on to Egypt, where Modesty and Willie get captured by Gabriel's gang. The diamond heist succeeds, and the action moves to a small island in the Mediterranean where Modesty has to vanquish the incredible Mrs. Fothergill in unarmed combat. But then all of Gabriel's gang are in pursuit, and there is nowhere to run.

See also
Modesty Blaise (character)

External links

1965 British novels
Modesty Blaise books
Novels based on films
1965 debut novels